Manners are the codes of socially accepted behavior.

Manners may also refer to:

People with the name

Alias
 Miss Manners, the pen name of American newspaper columnist Judith Martin

Surname
Several of the names below have a connection to family of the Dukes of Rutland. The name is of the same origin as Menzies. 
 Lady Alice Manners (born 1995), British socialite and columnist
 Archie Manners (born 1993), British magician, comedian, and television presenter
 Lord Cecil Manners (1868–1945), British Conservative politician
 Charles Manners (disambiguation), several people
 David Manners (disambiguation), several people
 Lady Diana Cooper (1892–1986), née Manners, English socialite
 Dunlop Manners (1916–1994), English cricketer and British Army officer
 Edward Manners, 3rd Earl of Rutland (1548–1587)
 Eleanor Manners, Countess of Rutland (c. 1495–1551), lady-in-waiting to four of King Henry VIII's wives
 Elizabeth Cecil, 16th Baroness de Ros (c. 1574/75–1591), née Manners
 Lord Edward Manners (1864–1903), British politician and army officer
 Emma Manners, Duchess of Rutland (born 1963), British podcaster
 Frances Manners (1753–1792), Countess of Tyrconnel
 Francis Manners, 6th Earl of Rutland (1578–1632)
 George Manners (disambiguation), several people
 Henry Manners, 2nd Earl of Rutland (1526–1563)
 Henry Manners, 8th Duke of Rutland (1852–1925), British politician
 Jack Manners (born c. 1915), Canadian Football League player
 J. Hartley Manners (1870–1928), British playwright
 John Manners (disambiguation), several people
 Katherine Villiers, Duchess of Buckingham (died 1649), née Manners, richest woman in Britain apart from royalty
 Katherine Manners, British actress and playwright
 Kathleen Manners, Duchess of Rutland (1894–1989), British aristocrat
 Kim Manners (1951–2009), American television producer, director and actor
 Rennison Manners (1904–1944), Canadian National Hockey League player
 Robert Manners (disambiguation), several people
 Roger Manners (disambiguation), several people
 Russell Manners (disambiguation), several people
 Sarah Manners (born 1975), English actress
 Lord Sherard Manners (c. 1713–1742), English nobleman and Member of Parliament
 Thomas Manners (disambiguation), several people
 Lord William Manners (1697–1772), English nobleman and Member of Parliament
 Zeke Manners (1911–2000), American country musician
 George Manners-Sutton (1751–1804), British politician
 Lady Violet Manners (born 1993), British socialite and model

Music
Manners (album), a 2009 album by Passion Pit
"Manners", a children's song about having good manners sung on Barney & Friends
"Manners", a 2011 single by Icona Pop
"Manners", a song by Band-Maid from the 2021 album Unseen World

Other uses
Baron Manners, a title in the Peerage of the United Kingdom
Manners (crater), on Mars
, two ships of the British Royal Navy
Comedy of manners

See also
 Manner (disambiguation)